The Knife River is a  river of northern Minnesota which drains a portion of Lake and Saint Louis counties into Lake Superior between Duluth and Two Harbors.

Name
The Knife River's name is an accurate preservation of its native Ojibwe name, Mokomani Zibi. Its original name was probably given on account of the long, sharp stones near the mouth of the river.

Geography
The main branch of the Knife River flows  from source to mouth, flowing parallel to the shoreline from the direction of Two Harbors. It has four or five major tributaries. There is concern over the river's water quality due to suspended sediment, and it was placed on the state's impaired waters list in 1998. A 2008 study found that about sixty percent of the sediment was coming from erosion of the streambanks, and about thirty from erosion of the river's bluffs.

The Knife River's watershed is largely undeveloped, being 72% forest, 16% wetland, and 6% grassland. 5% is used for agricultural purposes, and the remaining 1% is the unincorporated community of Knife River, Minnesota, located at the river's mouth.

See also
List of rivers of Minnesota

References

Rivers of Minnesota
Tributaries of Lake Superior
Rivers of Lake County, Minnesota
Rivers of St. Louis County, Minnesota
Northern Minnesota trout streams